Lubertus Hendricus "Bert" van Lingen (28 December 1945) is a Dutch professional football coach who enjoyed two spells in charge of the Netherlands women's national football team.

He later became an acolyte of Dick Advocaat, accompanying the self-styled 'Little General' on lucrative assignments at Glasgow Rangers, Zenit Saint Petersburg and Sunderland.

Van Lingen is married to Vera Pauw, a former player in his charge some 17 years his junior, who herself went on to coach the Netherlands women's team as well.

References

1945 births
Living people
Footballers from Delft
Dutch football managers
Netherlands women's national football team managers
De Graafschap managers
Rangers F.C. non-playing staff
Sunderland A.F.C. non-playing staff
FC Zenit Saint Petersburg non-playing staff
Association footballers not categorized by position
Association football players not categorized by nationality